Huw Thomas is a Welsh Labour politician and leader of Cardiff Council since May 2017.

Childhood and education

Huw Thomas was born in Aberystwyth in 1985 and attended local schools before studying Music at Oxford University and a Masters in International Relations at Aberystwyth University

After graduating he worked in the third sector in Cardiff, including for Sustrans and as Head of Christian Aid Wales.

Political career

Cardiff Council Executive (2012-2014)
Thomas was elected to represent the Splott ward on Cardiff Council in 2012 he was immediately appointed as Executive Member for Cabinet Member for Culture, Leisure & Sport in the new Labour administration which following Labour's victory before moving to become the Cabinet Member for Health & Social Care in July 2013.

Thomas left his post in March 2014 following the appointment of new Council leader Phil Bale.

Ceredigion 2015 Campaign

In December 2013 Thomas was selected as the Welsh Labour candidate to contest Ceredigion in the 2015 General Election where he finished fifth with 9.7% of the vote.

During the election his was highly critical of his Plaid Cymru rival Mike Parker over Parker's remarks made in 2001 about English people coming to live in Wales which he described as parts of Wales of being inhabited by "gun-toting Final Solution crackpots" and likened English incomers [to Mid Wales] as Nazis. Thomas said: "There should be no place in our politics or our society for such divisive and hateful language."

It emerged during the campaign that as a student he had suggested to friends in Wales via an online forum that cars flying the English Flag during the 2006 World Cup could be vandalised with tippex whilst simultaneously suggesting that those who flew them were a "simpleton" or a "casual racist". Thomas apologised for the remarks in 2015 when they were published by the BBC.

Leader of Cardiff Council (2017 to present)
Thomas was re-elected as a Councillor in 2017 and quickly announced he planned to challenge the then leader of Cardiff Council Phil Bale for the leadership  - a challenge he duly won.

As leader he proposed a Cardiff style 'Crossrail' scheme, and faced criticism for suggesting a Congestion Charge for Cardiff.

References 

Welsh Labour politicians
Alumni of the University of Oxford
People from Aberystwyth
Alumni of Aberystwyth University
1985 births
Living people
Welsh Labour councillors
Councillors in Cardiff
Leaders of local authorities of Wales
21st-century Welsh politicians